John H. Fitzgerald (May 30, 1870 – March 31, 1921), was an American Major League Baseball player who pitched one season in the majors with the 1891 Boston Reds.  He pitched in a total of six games, started three, completed two of them.  He struck out 16 batters in 32 innings pitched.

References

External links

19th-century baseball players
Baseball players from Massachusetts
Major League Baseball pitchers
Boston Reds (AA) players
People from Natick, Massachusetts
Lynn Lions players
New Haven Blues players
Sportspeople from Middlesex County, Massachusetts
Salem (minor league baseball) players
Binghamton Bingos players
Providence Clamdiggers (baseball) players
Wilkes-Barre Coal Barons players
Worcester (minor league baseball) players
Brockton Shoemakers players
1870 births
1921 deaths